The 2018–19 Greek betshop.gr Basket League was the 79th season of the Greek Basket League, the top-tier level professional club basketball league in Greece. The season started on 7 October 2018, and ended on 15 June 2019. Panathinaikos OPAP won the Greek Basket League championship for a record 37th time, after beating Promitheas Patras 3–0 in the Finals.

The season infamously featured a major feud between traditional rivals Panathinaikos and Olympiacos over refereeing decisions in the 2019 Greek Cup semifinals game between the two teams, which eventually culminated in Olympiacos also forfeiting their playoffs. Finally, Olympiacos withdrew from the championship.

Teams

Promotion and relegation
Relegated from the Greek betshop.gr Basket League 2017–18 season: Koroivos and Trikala Aries were relegated, after finishing in the last two places in the 2017–18 season.

Promoted from the A2 Basket League 2017–18 season: the first club that was promoted was Peristeri, which won its third A2 Basket League championship, after finishing with a 29–1 record, in the 2017–18 season. The second team to be promoted was Holargos, as the winners of the promotion play-offs. Holargos defeated Apollon Patras 3–0, in the finals of the play-offs.

Locations and arenas

Personnel and Sponsorship

Head coaching changes

Regular season

League table

Results

Playoffs
The eight highest ranked teams in the regular season qualified for the playoffs. All series will be played with a 2–2–1 format.

Bracket

Quarterfinals

|}

Semifinals

|}

Third place series

|}

Finals

|}

1 Olympiacos refused to participate in their playoff series against Panathinaikos over refereeing disputes.

Final standings

NOTES:
Holargos was faced financial problems. The club's registered place in the top-tier Greek Basket League was purchased by Kolossos Rodou, which thus avoided being relegated.

Kymi was faced financial problems. The club's registered place in the top-tier Greek Basket League was purchased by Lavrio, which thus avoided being relegated.

Olympiacos was relegated on 22 May 2019, following a meeting of the Hellenic Basketball Clubs Association's Board of Directors. This was due to the club refusing to play in its playoff series against Panathinaikos, which marked its third forfeited game of the season, and which resulted in an automatic relegation, per league rules. The league also stripped the team of all of its season wins, as a further punishment.

Awards

 MVP:  Nick Calathes – Panathinaikos
 Best Young Player:  Zois Karampelas – Aris
 Best Defender:  Nick Calathes – Panathinaikos
 Most Improved Player:  Dimitris Kaklamanakis – Lavrio
 Coach of the Year:  Makis Giatras – Promitheas Patras

Clubs in European-wide competitions

See also
2018–19 Greek Basketball Cup
2018–19 Greek A2 Basket League (2nd tier)

References

External links 
 Official Basket League Site 
 Official Basket League Site 
 Official Hellenic Basketball Federation Site 

Greek Basket League seasons
1
Greek